Henggart is a railway station in the Swiss canton of Zurich and municipality of Henggart. It is located on the Rheinfall line and is served by Zurich S-Bahn line S12 and S33.

References

External links 

Henggart station on Swiss Federal Railway's web site

Henggart
Henggart